The 76th World Science Fiction Convention (Worldcon), also known as Worldcon 76 in San Jose, was held on 16–20 August 2018 in San Jose, California, United States.

Participants

Guests of Honor 

 Chelsea Quinn Yarbro (author)
 Spider Robinson (author)
 John Picacio (artist)
 Frank Hayes (musician)
 Pierre and Sandy Pettinger (fans)

Awards

2018 Hugo Awards 

The winners were:

 Best Novel: The Stone Sky, by N. K. Jemisin
 Best Novella: All Systems Red, by Martha Wells
 Best Novelette: "The Secret Life of Bots", by Suzanne Palmer
 Best Short Story: "Welcome to your Authentic Indian Experience™", by Rebecca Roanhorse
 Best Series: World of the Five Gods, by Lois McMaster Bujold
 Best Related Work: No Time to Spare: Thinking About What Matters, by Ursula K. Le Guin
 Best Graphic Story: Monstress, Volume 2: The Blood, written by Marjorie M. Liu, illustrated by Sana Takeda
 Best Dramatic Presentation, Long Form: Wonder Woman, screenplay by Allan Heinberg, story by Zack Snyder & Allan Heinberg and Jason Fuchs, directed by Patty Jenkins
 Best Dramatic Presentation, Short Form: The Good Place: "The Trolley Problem", written by Josh Siegal and Dylan Morgan, directed by Dean Holland
 Best Professional Editor, Long Form: Sheila E. Gilbert
 Best Professional Editor, Short Form: Lynne M. Thomas & Michael Damian Thomas
 Best Professional Artist: Sana Takeda
 Best Semiprozine: Uncanny Magazine
 Best Fanzine: File 770
 Best Fancast: Ditch Diggers, presented by Mur Lafferty and Matt Wallace
 Best Fan Writer: Sarah Gailey
 Best Fan Artist: Geneva Benton

Declined or ineligible 

The following nominees received enough votes to qualify for the final ballot, but either declined nomination or were found to be ineligible.

 Best Series:
 Declined
 The Broken Earth
 Not enough words published since last appearance in this category. The administrators ruled that the Best Series category presented in 2017 as a special category was effectively the same category as this Best Series category, and therefore the rules for re-eligibility applied.
 The Expanse
 The Craft Sequence
 October Daye
 Best Editor, Long Form: Liz Gorinsky (declined)
 Best Professional Artist: Julie Dillon (declined)
 Best Fancast: Tea and Jeopardy (declined)

Other awards 

The winners were:

 Lodestar Award for Best Young Adult Book: Akata Warrior, by Nnedi Okorafor
 John W. Campbell Award for Best New Writer: Rebecca Roanhorse

See also 

 Hugo Award
 Science fiction
 Speculative fiction
 World Science Fiction Society
 Worldcon

References 

2018 conferences
Science fiction conventions in the United States
Worldcon